Song Dongye is a Chinese folk and ballad singer-songwriter. He was born on 10 November 1987 in Haidian District, Beijing.

In 2009, he joined the watercress independent music, creating "Catch the Fat Man", "Every year", "Buddha in the Line 1," "Hey, pants" and other songs.

In 2010, he released a Solo Album Slush hung claw, Annual, Buddha at the first line, Hey, pants children and other songs.

In 2011, Song Dongye, Yao Shisan and Di Ma founded a music label – sesame leaf civil society organizations, began a special performance.

In 2012, he released the single "Miss Dong" in April 2013. The single "Miss Dong" won the Billboard Music thirteenth annual festival of the best ballads newcomer.

In June 2013, 2013 Happy Boys players covered "Miss Dong", which caused widespread concern across the country.

In December 2013, the album North of Anhe Bridge (Chinese:安河橋北) won the prize of Lu Xun culture annual music awards.

References

External links
 

Chinese folk singers
1987 births
Living people
21st-century Chinese male singers